Paul de Lacy is a linguist and Professor Emeritus of Linguistics at Rutgers University. He is currently Honorary Associate Professor at the University of Auckland. He is known for his works on phonology.

Books
 de Lacy, Paul (2006). Markedness: Reduction and Preservation in Phonology. Cambridge Studies in Linguistics 112. Cambridge University Press.
 de Lacy, Paul (ed.) (2007), The Cambridge Handbook of Phonology. Cambridge: Cambridge University Press.

References

Phonologists
Living people
Rutgers University faculty
Academic staff of the University of Auckland
University of Massachusetts Amherst alumni
Linguists from New Zealand
Year of birth missing (living people)